Yaki Aithany Yen Tavio (born April 21, 1989) is a Spanish-born Taiwanese professional footballer who currently plays as a centre-back for Wuhan Three Towns.

Club career
Yaki Yen would start his career with his local outfit Fuerteventura in the 2008–09 Segunda División B season. After two seasons he would move to Lucena, before having spells at other lower league clubs in Atlético Granadilla and UD Pájara Playas de Jandía. With the financial difficulties and the disbandment of UD Pájara Playas de Jandía, he would go on trail before having a spell at lower league side El Cotillo.

On 22 September 2015 he went on trial for Changchun Yatai F.C. and on 31 December 2015 he was revealed as a new player on a 5-year contract at the club. He would go on to make his debut in a league game on 6 March 2016 against Hangzhou Greentown in a 2-1 defeat. After two seasons with the club on 28 February 2018, Yen transferred to China League One side Qingdao Huanghai. He would go on to be part of the team that won the 2019 China League One division title and promotion to the top tier. 

On 2 April 2021 he would transfer to second tier club Wuhan Three Towns. He would establish himself as a regular within the team and go on to win the division title win and promotion as the club entered the top tier for the first tine in their history. The following campaign he would be part of the squad that won the 2022 Chinese Super League title.

International career
Yen is eligible for Republic of China citizenship due to his father being a citizen; therefore, he is eligible to represent Taiwan. In  2015, he received his citizenship, and made his debut for the World Cup Qualification match against Iraq on 9 September 2015 in Tehran, Iran. He scored his first international goal through a stunning header against Thailand during the World Cup Qualification match on 12 November 2015 in Bangkok, Thailand. Yen left the national team in September 2016, citing disagreements with coach Toshiaki Imai. However, after Imai left his role in charge of the national team, Yen accepted a callup from caretaker boss Kazuo Kuroda in May 2017.

Personal life
Yen was born in the city of Puerto del Rosario, Spain to a Taiwanese father and a Spanish mother.

Career statistics

Club
.

International goals
Scores and results list Chinese Taipei's goal tally first.

Honours

Club
Qingdao Huanghai
China League One: 2019

Wuhan Three Towns
Chinese Super League: 2022.
China League One: 2021

References

External links
Player profile at Resultados-futbol.com

1989 births
Living people
People with acquired Taiwanese citizenship
Association football central defenders
Taiwanese footballers
Chinese Taipei international footballers
Taiwanese expatriate footballers
Taiwanese people of Spanish descent
People from Fuerteventura
Sportspeople from the Province of Las Palmas
Footballers from Las Palmas
Spanish footballers
Lucena CF players
Changchun Yatai F.C. players
Qingdao F.C. players
Chinese Super League players
China League One players
Spanish people of Taiwanese descent
Sportspeople of Chinese descent